This is a list of scripted British television programmes featuring one or more actors of Asian ancestry as the programme's leading actor portraying the protagonist or protagonists.

List of television programmes

1980s
The Chinese Detective (protagonist portrayed by David Yip)
The Jewel in the Crown (protagonist portrayed by Art Malik)

1990s
Goodness Gracious Me (the entire cast)

2000s
The Kumars at No. 42 (the entire cast)
My Life as a Popat (majority of the cast)
M.I. High (first five series starring Rachel Petladwala)
 Planet Ajay starring Ajay Chhabra
 The Sarah Jane Adventures (lead characters played by Yasmin Paige and Anjli Mohindra)

2010s
Spirit Warriors (majority of the cast), first British television drama series to have a predominantly East Asian cast
The Indian Doctor (protagonist portrayed by Sanjeev Bhaskar)
Citizen Khan (majority of the cast)
Ackley Bridge (half the cast)
Street Fighter: Assassin's Fist (majority of the cast)
PREMature (majority of the cast)
Indian Summers (half the cast)
The Bisexual (protagonist portrayed by Desiree Akhavan
The A List (protagonist portrayed by Lisa Ambalavanar)
Strangers (half the cast)
Humans (protagonist portrayed by Gemma Chan)
Informer (protagonist portrayed by Nabhaan Rizwan)
Man Like Mobeen (protagonist portrayed by Guz Khan)
Zomboat (ITV series, protagonists portrayed by Hamza Jeetooa and Ryan McKen)
Giri/Haji (protagonist portrayed by Takehiro Hira)
Killing Eve (protagonist portrayed by Sandra Oh)
What We Do in the Shadows (protagonist portrayed by Kayvan Novak)
Almost Never (TV series) (protagonist portrayed by Nathaniel Dass)
 Departure (TV series) (protagonist portrayed by Archie Panjabi)
 The Good Karma Hospital (half the cast)

2020s
Get Even (protagonist portrayed by Kim Adis) first British show to feature a South East Asian lead.
Baghdad Central (protagonist portrayed by Waleed Zuaiter) first British produced show with a West Asian Arab lead.
Intelligence (protagonist portrayed by Nick Mohammed)
Sandylands (protagonists portrayed by Natalie Dew, Sanjeev Bhaskar and Hamza Jeetooa)
A Suitable Boy, a miniseries adapted from Vikram Seth's 1993 novel of the same name,  (majority of the cast from South Asia)
The Irregulars (protagonist portrayed by Thaddea Graham)
Shadow and Bone (protagonists played by Jessie Mei Li, Archie Renaux and Amita Suman)
Starstruck (co-leads played by Nikesh Patel and Sindhu Vee)
We Are Lady Parts (majority of the cast)
This Is Going to Hurt (co-lead played by Ambika Mod)
Hullraisers (co-lead played by Taj Atwal)
DI Ray (protagonist played by Parminder Nagra)
PRU (co-lead played by Jaye Ersavas)
Count Abdulla (Majority of cast)

See also
American television series with Asian leads

References

Asian lead
Asian-British culture